The Buick Electra is a full-size luxury car manufactured and marketed by Buick from 1959 to 1990, over six generations. Introduced as the replacement for the Roadmaster lines, the Electra served as the flagship Buick sedan line through its entire production and was offered as a six-passenger four-door sedan with two-door sedan, two-door convertible, and five-door station wagon variants.

The Electra initially used GM's rear-drive C Platform, undergoing a significant downsizing for 1977.  

For its sixth generation, introduced for model year 1985, the Electra underwent another significant downsizing, and adopted unibody construction as well as GM's new front-drive C Platform — becoming along with its rebadged variants, the Oldsmobile 98 and Cadillac Deville and Fleetwood, the company's first full-size, unibody, transverse engine, front-drive cars.

For 1991, Buick retired the Electra nameplate, migrating its front-drive premium sedan to the Buick Park Avenue nameplate, previously used as an upper trim level of the Electra itself.  The Electra Estate was redesigned, becoming the Roadmaster Estate for 1991.

In late 2022, Buick announced plans to revive the Electra nameplate for its forthcoming 2024 electric models.

Origin of name 
The Buick Electra was named after Texas socialite and sculptor Electra Waggoner Biggs, sister-in-law of GM President Harlow H. Curtice.  Also namesake of the Lockheed L-188 Electra airliner, Biggs owned the Waggoner Ranch (one of the largest ranches in Texas) and as an artist, created portrait sculptures of two US presidents and other American figures.

First generation (1959–1960) 

Following World War II, the Roadmaster constituted the upper echelon of Buick's lineup.  For 1958, Buick returned the Limited nameplate (dormant since 1942), slotted between the Roadmaster and the Cadillac Series 62.

For 1959, the Super was renamed the Invicta, the Roadmaster was renamed the Electra and Electra 225, and the unsuccessful Limited model was discontinued. The appearance was shared with two other Buick models, the mid-level Invicta and the entry level LeSabre. The Electra 225 nameplate was a nod to the car's overall length of over 225 in (5,715 mm), earning it the street name "deuce and a quarter."

The Electra 225 Riviera was the top-line model and it shared its six window hardtop roofline exclusively with Cadillac (which offered it on all of its models). Buick first applied the "Riviera" name to a premium trimmed 2-door Roadmaster hardtop in the middle of the 1949 model year, and thereafter denoted all Buick hardtops Rivieras. Also, from 1950 through 1953, Buick made a premium trimmed, stretched wheelbase sedan, exclusively in the Roadmaster and Super lines, that was called Riviera. But 1959 was the first year that not all Buick hardtops were called Rivieras. A standard 4-window four-door hardtop was also available, as was a 4-door 6-window pillared sedan, along with a stripped chassis of which 144 were built in 1959 and 1960. The two-door convertible was only available as an Electra 225, and the 2-door hardtop as an Electra.

The standard and only available engine was the 401 cubic-inch Wildcat V8 with four-barrel carburetor, 10.25 to 1 compression ratio and  mated to a two-speed Dynaflow automatic transmission, which was also standard equipment along with power steering and power brakes using Buick's unique  finned aluminum brake drums. Power windows and seat and leather interiors were standard on the Electra 225 convertible and optional on all other models. Front bucket seats were optional on the convertible. Electra interiors were trimmed in nylon Mojave cloth or broadcloth combinations with "Cordaveen". Electra 225 convertibles were trimmed in leather. Standard Electra features included horizontal Red-line speedometer, two-speed electric windshield wipers, trip mileage indicator, cigar lighter, dual sunshades, Step-On parking brake, dual horns, Twin-Turbine automatic transmission, Foamtex seat cushions, electric clock, trunk light, glovebox light, power steering, power brakes, full wheelcovers and dual exhaust. In addition Electra 225s had Super Deluxe wheelcovers and an outside rearview mirror as standard equipment. Padded dashboards were also standard. The Electra, along with all other 1959 Buicks, featured all new styling not shared with other GM divisions that included slanted headlights in front along with a highly chromed square grille somewhat similar to the 1958 Buick and "Delta-Fins" back along with round taillights. The "slanted" headlights were also shared with the 1958–60 Lincoln Continental. Exterior distinction from other Buicks came from extra-wide moldings, with a massive Electra emblem on the front fender extension. The Electra 225 script was found on the front fenders ahead of the wheelhouse. The 4-door models had a lower bright rear fender molding as well.

The 1960 Electra and Electra 225 received a minor facelift with a concave grille and horizontal headlights centered by Buick's then-new "Trishield" logo, which is still in use today. Reintroduced to Electras and other Buicks for 1960 were the chrome VentiPorts first introduced in 1949 and last seen in 1957. Electra and Electra 225 models featured four VentiPorts on each front fender while lesser LeSabre and Invicta models had three VentiPorts. Electras featured wider rocker panel bright moldings and the Electra script on the front fenders ahead of the wheelhouse. Electra 225s featured a badge that was circled on the deck lid. The Electra 225 name was found on the front fenders in place of the Electra name.

Inside, a revised instrument panel featured "Mirromatic", where the speedometer, odometer and any warning light indicators are reflected from an adjustable tilt mirror inside the dashboard for comfortable viewing that would reduce unwanted glare and reflection. A new two-spoke steering wheel with horn bars was introduced, replacing the time honored horn ring then still common to most automobiles. Brisbane cloth interiors graced closed models while the convertible was trimmed in leather. Convertibles also had a two way power seat adjuster and power windows standard.  The bucket seat option introduced on Electra 225 convertibles in 1959 was now available on Electra coupes and included a center consolette with storage compartment. Standard Electra features included windshield wipers, trip mileage indicator, cigar lighter, dual sunshades, Step-On parking brake, dual horns, a single-key locking system, Twin-Turbine automatic transmission, Foamtex seat cushions, electric clock, trunk light, license plate frames, glovebox light, power steering and power brakes. In addition Electra 225s had back-up lights, a Glare-proof rear view mirror, parking brake signal light, safety buzzer, map light and Super Deluxe wheelcovers as standard equipment.

Second generation (1961–1964) 

The Electra, along with the Invicta and LeSabre, was redesigned for 1961 with drastically shrunken fins, and was joined with the all-new compact sized Skylark/Special. Electras featured bright rocker panel and wheelhouse moldings.  Four VentiPorts per front fender were a hallmark, with identification spelled out on the front fender plaques.  Electra 225s had four "hash marks" interrupting behind the wheelhouse of the rear fender. Electra 225 nameplates were found on the front fenders. Electra interiors were trimmed in fabric. Electra 225s were trimmed in Calais cloth or leather trim, except for convertibles which were trimmed in vinyl. An optional Custom interior featured leather trim, while another featured vinyl with contrasting vertical stripes and front bucket seats with a storage consolex and power two-way seat adjustment.  Standard equipment on the Electra included Turbine-Drive automatic transmission, "Mirromatic" instrument panel, directional signals, full-flow oil filter, electric windshield wipers, Deluxe steering wheel, trip mileage indicator, cigar lighter, Step-On brake, dual armrests, cloth and vinyl trim, combinations, carpeting, power steering, power brakes, two-speed windshield wiper/washer system, glovebox light, Custom-padded seat cushions and Deluxe wheelcovers. Two-tone Electras had the color accent on the rear cove. In addition Electra 225s had back-up lights, Glare-proof rearview mirror, parking lights, signal light, safety buzzer, courtesy lights, two-way power seat, Super Deluxe wheelcovers with gold accents and power windows. The Electra and Electra 225 were the same length in 1961. Buick discontinued the Electra nameplate at the end of the 1961 model year, leaving only the Electra 225 starting in 1962.

The big Buick of 1962 carried four VentiPorts per front fender and featured a rakish sculptured restyle of its 1961 guise. The hardtop coupe and standard hardtop sedan featured a convertible inspired semi-formal roofline, while the Riviera hardtop sedan continued to use six-window pillarless configuration. Electra 225 rear fenders had a group of vertical hashmarks, with Electra 225 spelled out in block letters just above. A full length bright strip crowned the upper  body ridge, while the tower rocker molding and wheelhouses were accented with bright trim. Wheelcovers had a gold accent ring. Interiors were of the finest cloth and, on the convertible, leather was used. Standard features included directional signals, full-flow oil filter, dual speed electric windshield washer/wipers, Deluxe steering wheel, cigar lighter, Step-on parking brake, dual armrests, Turbine-Drive transmission, padded dashboard, heater, defroster, glovebox light, back-up lights, power steering, Glare-proof rearview mirror, power brakes, power brake signal light, safety buzzer, courtesy lights, two-way power seats, power windows, Super Deluxe wheelcovers, Safety option group, custom padded cushions, Accessory Group options and custom moldings.

Buick's largest, plushest and most expensive models were restyled for 1963, with distinctive rear fenders culminating in a sharp vertical edge housing narrow back-up lights. The taillights were horizontally placed in the vertical deck cove. A unique cast grille was used at the front. Bright wheelhouse and lower body moldings, with ribbed rear fender panels were used. Red-filled Electra 225 badges were found on the rear fenders, while four VentiPorts lent status to the front fenders. Interiors were cloth and vinyl combinations, while a Custom interior in vinyl and leather, with front bucket seats and a storage console, was available for the convertible and sport coupe. Standard equipment included directional signals, full-flow oil filter, dual speed electric windshield wiper/washers, Deluxe steering wheel, cigar lighter, Step-On parking brake, dual armrests, Turbine-Drive automatic transmission, padded dashboard, heater, defroster, glovebox light, back-up lights, power steering, Glare-proof rearview mirror, power brakes, parking brake signal light, safety buzzer, courtesy lights, two-way power seats, power windows, Super Deluxe wheelcovers, Safety option group, custom padded cushions, Accessory Group options and custom moldings. Buick dropped the Riviera name as a body style designation after the 1963 model year, shifting the Riviera name exclusively to Buick's new personal luxury coupe that had been introduced in 1963. Buick added a 7-way tilt steering wheel and a new cruise control as an option.

The large General Motors C-body was used to create the 1964 Electra 225, Buick's richest full-size car. Vertical, narrow taillamps were found in the nearly straight-cut rear fender ends, and the so-called "Deuce-and-a Quarter" came with fender skirts. Four traditional VentiPorts were found on the front fenders, with heavy die-cast grille accenting the frontal aspect. Wide front lower body moldings were used along with a bright deck cove insert. Electra 225 lettering was found on the rear fenders and specific full wheelcovers were featured. Vinyl and brocade cloth interior trims were found in closed models, while leather upholstery was offered for seats in the convertible. Among the Electra's exclusive standard equipment were power steering; power brakes; two-speed electric wipers with windshield washer; foam padded seats; electric clock; license frame; trunk light; two-way power seat and power windows for the convertible; safety buzzer; and additional courtesy lights. The two-speed Dynaflow automatic was replaced by the 3-speed TH-400 as standard equipment.

Third generation (1965–1970) 

All GM passenger vehicles received a major redesign in 1965 dominated by flowing "Coke bottle" lines and fastback roof profiles on its coupe models, and the 6 window-body style was eliminated. For 1965, Buick also changed its marketing strategy and offering the Electra 225 in two trim levels, base and Custom. Along with the new body came a new chassis with a full perimeter frame including side rails that replaced the previous "X" frame used since 1961. The three-speed Super Turbine 400 automatic transmission was standard equipment. A new body style introduced for 1965 was the thin-pillar 4-door sedan, which featured frameless window glass with a thin, chrome fixed "B" pillar.

The 1966 Electra 225 saw only minor styling changes including a new grille and a revised full-width taillight and trunk lid that included an "Electra 225" script rather than the "BUICK" nameplate spelled out in 1965. Engine offerings were unchanged from 1965 with the exception that the dual-quad  425 was downgraded from a factory option to dealer-installed. Inside, a revised instrument panel featured a horizontal sweep speedometer, fuel gauge and warning lights. Front seat headrests became an option.

A moderate facelift highlighted the 1967 Electra 225 including a Pontiac/Oldsmobile-like divided split grille. Both base and Custom models were continued with a new "Limited" option package available Electra 225 Custom 4-door hardtop reviving a nameplate that graced Buick's ultra-luxury flagship in the late 1930s (and again in 1958), which included an ultra-luxurious interior trim. Power front disc brakes were available as a new option along with a stereo 8-track tape player.

The 1968 Electra 225 received a revised grille and taillight trim along with concealed windshield wipers. Inside, there was a revised instrument panel with a square speedometer and other instruments, plus a new steering wheel. Shoulder seat-belts were standard for both the driver and front passenger. Base and Custom models were still offered, with the Limited trim option available on the Electra 225 Custom hardtop sedan.

The 1969s were also the first to offer headrests as standard equipment due to a federal safety mandate, and the steering column with ignition switch that also locked the steering wheel with the transmission in "Park", a feature found on all 1969 GM cars one year before it became a federal safety mandate in 1970. Also new was a variable-ratio power steering system combined with revised front suspension tuning called "Accu-Drive." Other changes included ventless front windows. The same assortment of base and Custom models were offered in 1969 with the "Limited" trim package available on Custom sedans and coupes. A new option available with the Limited package was a split 60/40 bench seat with center armrest. Finned aluminum drum brakes were again offered as standard equipment, while the Bendix four-piston disk brake units were also available.  vented steel rotors were coupled with the cast iron caliper assemblies. A dual exhaust was available as an option. Five different rear axles were available: a 2.56 Economy as well as 2.73, 3.08, 3.23:1 gear ratios. The special PX-Code "AC Delete" 3.91 performance gear option was also available.

Only a minor facelift with revised grille and taillight trim marked the 1970 Electra 225. The big news was under the hood, where a new  455 cubic-inch V8 replaced the 430 V8 used from 1967 to 1969. This was the final year for the Electra convertible, finned aluminum brake drums and high compression engines. New this year was a concealed radio antenna, which amounted to two wires embedded in the windshield.  Also new for 1970 was the Estate Wagon, which shared the Electra's 455 V8 and four VentiPorts, but was a B-body car like the LeSabre and the Wildcat and consequently shared the smaller cars'  wheelbase and interior. This was Buick's first full-sized station wagon since 1964. The following year the Buick Estate would move up to Electra's larger body and more voluminous interior.

Fourth generation (1971–1976) 

Like the other GM brands, Buick completely restyled its B-body and C-body cars for 1971. The full-size cars emerged larger and heavier than ever before or after. The new GM full-size bodies, at 64.3" front shoulder room and 63.4" rear shoulder room set a record for interior width that would not be matched by any car until the full-size GM rear-wheel drive models of the early to mid 1990s. The styling featured curved bodysides, long hoods and wide expanses of glass. All Electra 225s were hardtops in the 1971 to 1973 model years, eliminating the previous four-door pillared sedan variant and the convertible. In 1974 Buick adopted GM's pillared coupe body and fitted it with the "Landau" option on the Electra Limited coupe. Optional driver and passenger airbags were also available from 1974 to 1976, but they were unpopular due to their cost.

In the first year for new GM C-body shared with Oldsmobile 98 and Cadillac, the 1971 Electra 225 rode on a new body chassis which retained the  wheelbase with styling evolutionary from previous models. The new design included a double-shell roof for improved roll-over protection and noise reduction. Inside was a new wrap-around cockpit style instrument panel shared with B-body LeSabre and Centurion models that grouped all instruments with easy reach of the driver.  Under the hood, the 455-cubic-inch V8 was retained as standard equipment, but featured a lower compression of 8.5 to 1 compared to 10.25 to 1 in 1970 as part of a GM corporate mandate requiring all engines to run on 91 Research octane regular leaded, low-lead or unleaded gasolines. Horsepower also dropped from 370 to 315 as a result. Standard equipment continued to consist of variable-ratio power steering and Turbo Hydra-matic transmission. Power front disc brakes were now standard equipment on Electras, replacing the  finned aluminum drum brakes used in full-sized Buicks since the late 1950s.  Also new for the 1971 Electra 225, as well as the B-body LeSabre and Centurion, and E-body Riviera, was a new power ventilation system. The system, shared with other GM B-, C- and E-body cars along with the compact Chevrolet Vega, used the heater fan to draw air into the car from the cowl intake, and force it out through vents in the trunk lid or tailgate. In theory, passengers could enjoy fresh air even when the car was moving slowly or stopped, as in heavy traffic. In practice, however, it didn't work.  Within weeks of the 1971 models' debut, however, Buick—and all other GM dealers—received multiple complaints from drivers who complained the ventilation system pulled cold air into the car before the heater could warm up—and could not be shut off. The ventilation system was extensively revised for 1972.

From 1971 to 1976, Buick's full-sized Estate Wagon shared the  wheelbase and 455 cubic-inch V8 with the Electra 225, and shared its interior and exterior styling from 1971 to 1974 (complete with the prerequisite four VentiPorts). And although from 1975 to 1976 the number of VentiPorts were reduced by one, and the front fascia was downgraded to a LeSabre's, the Electra 225 style chrome rocker panel moldings and distinctive Electra 225 style rear quarter panels (albeit without fender skirts) remained. These were the first Buick station wagons to be built on Buick's largest chassis since the Roadmaster Estates of 1947–53. The Estate Wagons, as did other GM full-sized wagons during these years, used a unique rear suspension with multi-leaf springs instead of the coil springs used on other full-sized Buicks, and other full-sized GM cars. The Estate Wagons also featured a new 'clamshell' tailgate design where the rear power-operated glass slid up into the roof as the tailgate (manually or with power assist), slid into a recess under the cargo floor. The power tailgate, the first in station wagon history, ultimately supplanted the manual tailgate, which required marked effort to lift from storage. It was operated by switches on the instrument panel or a key switch on the rear quarter panel. The clamshell system, heavy and complex, made it easier to load and unload the extremely long wagons in tight spaces. But it remained un-adopted by any other manufacturer, and would be eliminated when GM reduced the length of their wagons by about a foot in 1977, and the overriding concern became increased fuel economy.  At  shipping weight, or about  curb weight, the three-seat 1974 Estate Wagons are easily the heaviest Buicks ever built, even heavier than the Buick Limited limousines of 1936–42.

A new egg-crate grille and taillight trim highlighted the 1972 Electra 225s. The trouble-prone ventilation system used in 1971 was replaced by a new system using vents in the doorjambs instead of the trunk-mounted vents of 1971.  The 455 V8 was carried over and now rated at 250 net horsepower compared to 315 gross horsepower in 1971. The differences in advertised horsepower in the two years was due to an industry-wide switch from "gross" (dynometer-rated and not installed in vehicle) to "net" (as installed in vehicle with accessories and emission controls installed) horsepower measurements.  The 1972 Buick was available as: Electra 225, Electra 225 Custom, and Electra 225 Custom Limited.

A revised egg-crate grille above a new federally mandated  front bumper and revised taillights were among the most noticeable changes for the 1973 Electra 225. All engines now featured EGR valves to meet increasingly stringent 1973 emission standards (the EGR valve was featured on Buick engines for California cars in 1972).

New grillework and a new rear with revised taillights and a federally mandated  rear bumper highlighted the 1974 Electra 225, still available in base and up level Electra Custom models. The Electra Limited, previously a luxurious trim option on the Custom models, was upgraded to full model status. Electra Limited models also got power windows, power driver's seat and a new digital clock as standard equipment, along with an optional leather upholstery trim, the first Buicks (along with that year's Riviera) to offer real leather seats since the 1963 Riviera. The 1974 Buick Electra Limited had velour seats and door panels that were the same as the 1974 Oldsmobile 98 Regency.  The 455 V8 was revised to meet the 1974 federal and California emission standards with horsepower dropping from 250 in 1972–73 to 230 for 1974. A one-year only option for the '74 Electra was the high-performance Stage 1 455 with dual exhausts and a  rating.  1974 was the last year for the pillarless hardtop coupe, although the 4 door hardtop would continue to be produced until 1976.  Inside, the wrap-around instrument panel was substantially revised and optionally available for the first time (and seldom ordered) was a driver's side airbag system with an exclusive steering wheel design. 1974 was the final year for the Max Trac traction control option. New options for 1974 included radial tires and a "low fuel" warning light came on when the gas tank was down to only four gallons. A new distinctive "Landau" option was available on the Limited coupe that included the now-popular rear side opera windows and rear-quarter vinyl roof.

1975 brought about changes in all of General Motors C-body cars. In 1975, all Electra 225 coupes had fixed rear side windows and center posts.  1975 also brought along a newer front end and interior design. Rectangular headlights became standard on all GM C-body cars, along with many others. This supposedly would allow engineers to lower the front end to reduce wind resistance, but this wasn't very apparent with the new design. The Electra received a new metal "eggcrate" style grille, which covered most of the front end, and wrapping under the headlights. The grille included running lights on either side. There was a choice of a base model Electra 225, whose trim and appointments were upgraded to the same level as the previous year's Electra 225 Custom, an upscale Limited, and the Park Avenue. These cars dwarfed the newer front-wheel drive Electras and Park Avenues in sheer size and weight. Power windows and a power driver's seat became standard on all Electra models in 1975. Also new to the standard equipment list were radial-ply tires. The 1975 Electra was one of the first GM vehicles to offer an Air Cushion Restraint System or "airbag". Inside, a new flat instrument panel (shared with LeSabre, Estate Wagon and Riviera) with horizontal sweep speedometer (silver facing with black lettering) replaced the wrap-around cockpit dash of previous years and door panel trim was revised. The 1975 Buick Electra Limited got an all new interior. Technical changes for 1975 included the addition of a catalytic converter and electronic ignition to not only meet the stringent 1975 and later emission requirements, but also extended routine maintenance intervals, and improved fuel economy and driveability which was a must in the era immediately following the 1973–74 energy crisis, but also spelled the end of dual exhaust systems and mandated the use of unleaded gasoline as the converter could be rendered useless if contaminated with lead. Axle ratios were also numerically lowered to aid in improving gas mileage.

1976 brought about a few changes on the Electra. The front-end was reworked, including the grille and bumper. The new plastic grille featured 17 vertical bars and covered much of the radiator. The grille did not extend under the headlights in 1976, but instead Buick moved the running lights and turn signal lights underneath the headlights, where the 1975 grille had once been. The bumper no longer housed running lights. There were also some minor interior differences. The brake release handle was black instead of chrome, the seat material was slightly different, on the limited, notch-back diamond pattern seating. The 1975 material appeared in a "corduroy" form, but the actual material was not corduroy. The 1976 diamond pattern seating material did not have this appearance. The engine air cleaner did not have a "cold-air" ram air intake hose like the 1975 model did, and there were some carburetor changes and camshaft changes to meet EPA standards. The rear end ratio also was higher than the 1975 standard, at 2.56:1 instead of 2.73:1. The Park Avenue and leather seating in 1975 and 1976 were the same. Once again, there was the base 225, the Limited, and the luxurious Park Avenue. The Park Avenue Deluxe vanished for 1976 due to poor sales.

The 1975 Buick Electra 225 Limited was the longest four-door hardtop car GM ever built, as the Cadillac Sixty Special (which was a bit longer) was unavailable as a hardtop sedan since the mid-sixties. The model also ushered in a return of the six window configuration that Buick offered between 1959 and 1964.

All Electras were powered by Buick's 455 cu. in. (7.5 L) engine between 1971 and 1976. Even at its weakest state, the Buick-built 455 engine still produced  of torque at 2000 rpm. The 455 was the standard engine on the Electra, but there were some built with Buick 350s during the GM strike, when 455 production halted. The 350 engine also came with a price rebate. The 455 engine disappeared after the 1976 model year, in favor of smaller, more efficient engines.

To commemorate the Bicentennial of the United States, the standard colors available on all Buicks were Judicial Black, Liberty White, Pewter Gray, Potomac Blue, Continental Blue, Concord Green, Constitution Green, Mount Vernon Cream, Buckskin Tan, Musket Brown, Boston Red and Independence Red, with specially available colors on select models Congressional Cream, Revere Red, Colonial Yellow and Firecracker Orange.

Total production for this generation was 794,833.

Electra Limited Park Avenue: Introduced for the 1975 model year, as an option package for the Electra Limited sedan, the Park Avenue, was originally an interior comfort and appearance package, which gave buyers velour, pillow-topped seating, velour headliner, thicker carpet, and an upscale door panel design. The Park Avenue's seats were designed by Flexsteel. This seating design was similar to the Cadillac Sixty Special with the Talisman (1974–1976) option and stayed with Park Avenue through the 1980 model year. The Park Avenue option also offered a full-size center console which eliminated the front, middle passenger space. The center console was eliminated in 1977. 1975 also offered a more luxurious Park Avenue Deluxe, which was sold only in 1975, and included every option available on the Electra (posi-traction, 15" rallye sport wheels, rear automatic leveling, etc.). The Park Avenue Deluxe was an expensive option not popular with buyers; only 37 were built. The Park Avenue would remain as the top-level trim package through 1988. In 1989, the Electra Park Avenue Ultra debuted as the top model. In 1991, the Electra name would be dropped completely and Park Avenue would replace it as the flagship Buick sedan.

Fifth generation (1977–1984) 

For 1977, a fifth-generation Electra was introduced as GM downsized its C-body full-size lines.  Again a counterpart of the Oldsmobile 98, the Electra shed over 11 inches of length and over 800 pounds of curb weight.  Coinciding with the major size reduction, Buick ended production of hardtop body styles, with both two-door and four-door Electras offered only as pillared sedans.  The downsized model brought increased sales, with 161,627 Electras produced in 1977.

As a consequence of the lighter body and chassis, the 455 V8 of the previous generation was retired entirely, with a 4-barrel Buick 350 V8 returning as the standard engine.  The Oldsmobile 403 V8 was introduced as an optional engine.

The Electra was offered in standard, Electra 225, and Electra Limited trims; the Park Avenue option was added to the two-door, though the full-length center console option was deleted from the option package.  The Estate Wagon shifted to the B-body chassis of the LeSabre, though adopting the front fascia of the Electra (with premium versions sharing interior trim).  For 1978, the Electra Park Avenue was added as a distinct trim level.

From 1977 to 1979, the exterior of the Electra saw minor yearly revisions.  For 1978, the grille was updated along with revised taillamps; for 1979, the front fascia was restyled with a flatter look, adding the Buick emblem to the taillamps.

1980 update: For 1980, all GM B and C-bodies underwent a mid-cycle model update, with multiple aerodynamic enhancements to the body.  Distinguished by a slightly lower hoodline, the sloped headlamp housings made their return, with a vertically-slatted grille.  In a notable change, the Electra 225 trim (in use since 1959) was retired.  To improve fuel economy, the Electra was no longer offered with a standard V8 engine, replaced with a Buick 4.1L V6.  The Buick 350 now became an option, with an Oldsmobile 307 V8 replacing the 403 V8.  As an additional option, the Oldsmobile 350 diesel V8 was introduced.  The new engines were paired with a 4-speed THM200-4R automatic transmission, which used a lockup torque converter and a 0.67:1 overdrive ratio. With the new transmission, the Electra could be equipped with a numerically higher rear axle ratio for better performance, while offering improved fuel economy with the overdrive range.

From 1981 onward, the Electra saw few model updates.  For 1981, the VentiPorts were deleted from non-Park Avenue trims.  On the latter, the Ventiports became vestigial indentations on their chrome fender trim.

For 1985, General Motors downsized nearly all of its full-size lines a second time.  While the Chevrolet Caprice Classic (which replaced the Impala entirely) and GM full-size station wagons remained, Buick, Oldsmobile, and Pontiac shifted to the front-wheel drive C-body and H-body platforms; Cadillac adopted the C-body for much of its lineup, with the Cadillac Brougham (replacing the de Ville and Fleetwood Brougham) remaining to support livery and professional car sales.

Production of the rear-wheel drive Electra ceased in April 1984.  Though it would use the slightly smaller B-body chassis (from the 1977–1985 LeSabre); the 1992–1996 Buick Roadmaster served as a functional successor of the 1977–1984 Buick Electra.  As of current North American production, the Roadmaster remains the final rear-wheel drive Buick sedan powered by a V8 engine.

Buick Estate While GM downsized its C-body sedans for 1985, Buick, Oldsmobile, and Pontiac full-size station wagons retained the full-size B-body platform for 1985.  Buick continued the use of the Electra Estate name for its highest-trim station wagon, which also served as the flagship station wagon of General Motors (as Cadillac did not offer a station wagon at the time). For 1990, Buick renamed its full-size wagon as the Buick Estate Wagon (dropping Electra and LeSabre).  For 1991, the B-body wagons were redesigned, with Buick introducing the Buick Roadmaster Estate.

For 1985–1990 figures, see Buick Estate.

Sixth generation (1985–1990) 

For model year 1985, GM introduced the downsized sixth-generation Electra in two- and four-door sedan body styles, using the company's newly developed C-body platform shared with the Oldsmobile 98 and the Cadillac Deville as well as their trim variants. Together, these were GM's first front-drive, transverse-engine, full-size cars. 

Using unibody rather than body-on-frame construction, the sixth generation was significantly shorter (24"), narrower, lighter (604 lbs) and more fuel-efficient than the previous generation. The C-platform Electra line nearly matched the key interior dimension of their predecessors, losing only one cubic foot of interior volume while providing a more nearly flat passenger compartment floor. Automotive journalist for Popular Science, Jim Dunne, nonetheless noted the cars did feel smaller inside; they featured thinner front seats and more tumblehome, thereby locating the side glass as well as the windshield closer to passengers. 

Introduced in early 1984, for model year 1985, the line was offered in three trim levels: Electra (300, 380 or 430 correlating to engine displacement); Park Avenue, the luxury variant; and the T-Type, a more sporty variant. Engines included a 3L Buick V6; 3.8L Buick V6, and 4.3L Oldsmobile diesel V6.

Standard features included a four speed automatic transmission with overdrive; multi-port (later, sequential) fuel injection with mass airflow sensor; four wheel-independent suspension, marketed as Dynaride; 14" steel wheels with covers; power windows; air conditioning; rack and pinion steering; and electronic fuel door release. Park Avenue trim included coach lamps, cruise control, acoustics package, electric door locks and trunk release. T-Type trim included the 3.8 liter engine; upgraded, firm suspension marketed as Grand Touring suspension, ceiling console, quartz analog gage cluster, black-wall radial all season tires, re-calibrated steering, 15" alloy wheels, 45/45 bucket front seats with floor console; leather-wrapped steering wheel; and passenger assist straps.

Optional features included two-position memory driver seat, an electronic instrument/gage cluster; an analog instrument/gage cluster; 14" alloy wheels; driver's sill-mounted button-operated keyless entry pad, passenger and driver powered seats, and electronic climate control. An electronic rear load-leveling suspension was offered, using air-pressurized rear Chapman struts to maintain a level ride height. 

Aside from its waterfall grill, the Electra was differentiated from its Oldsmobile and Cadillac counterparts by an engine hood that slid forward several inches on opening, and pivoted forward from its leading edge to provide engine access from each side. A similar, 'clamshell' approach had been initially considered for the trunk. On Park Avenue trims, an articulated chrome band that ran the length of the car, integrating the front and rear bumpers, and all trims featured a unique rear drop-in license plate holder. All C-bodies as well as H-bodies, benefited form GM's first effort  to begin addressing the "design" of the engine bay, to provide a more logical, organized layout. 

1987: For 1987, flush composite headlamps replaced previous exposed sealed-beam headlamps, with fixed glass and replaceable bulbs accessible from under hood.  For 1987, a Electra Limited trim replaced the Electra 'number nomenclature' trim, and the smallest engine was dropped.

1988: The two-door body style was eliminated for model year 1988, after an approximate total production of 15,000. For 1988, Buick introduced the 3800 V6, a major engine redesign, with the previous 3.8 L V6 version offered in some Electra models through model year 1988.

1989: In compliance with U.S. passive restraint standards, front seat-belts were door-mounted for the front outboard positions and three-point at the rear outboard positions. An optional remote keyless entry system with fob superseded the previously optional, sill-located, button-activated keyless entry.

As a running change during the 1989 model year, Buick introduced the flagship Park Avenue Ultra trim.  The Ultra featured silver lower body cladding replacing chrome trim, silver B-pillars, 15-inch alloy wheels, trim-specific grille and C-pillar badging, vinyl roof with a "frenched" rear window (as a no-cost option), leather trimmed steering wheel, door panels, and glove compartment door; tinted glass marketed as Soft-ray glass; smoked tail lamps, silver accent body stripe; and a split front bench seat with dual 20-way adjustment, styled by Giorgetto Giugiaro — similarly marketed by Cadillac on their 1987-1989 Sixty Special model. Options included the no-cost vinyl roof, power moonroof, cornering lamps, automatic climate control, and Twilight Sentinel.  The Ultra reached a production of 4,815 for 1989. 

1991:For the 1991 model year, the C-body sedans were redesigned, with Buick retiring the Electra nameplate and making the Buick Park Avenue a stand-alone model line.

Engines: The sixth-generation Buick Electra was introduced with three engines: the 110 hp 3.0-liter V6 (Electra 300) served as the standard engine, along with an optional  3.8-liter V6 (Electra 380) and a 4.3-liter naturally-aspirated diesel V6 (Electra 430). For 1986, the 3.0L and 4.3L engines were dropped; the 3.8L V6 becoming the sole engine; and the 300/380/430 nomenclature was retired. The 3.8 was upgraded and now produced . The previous 3.8 L V6 version was still offered in some Electra models through the 1988 model year, denoted by VIN code 3. Electras with the new 3800 V-6 were designated by VIN code C.

  Buick V6 – 1985 Electra 300,  at 4800 rpm,  at 2600 rpm
  Buick V6 – 1985–1986 Electra 380, 1987–1990 Electra Limited, 1985–1990 Electra T-Type, 1985–1990 Electra Park Avenue, 1989–1990 Electra Park Avenue Ultra
  Oldsmobile diesel V6 – 1985 Electra 430

Launched in April 1984, the 6th generation Electra was marketed briefly alongside its rear-wheel drive predecessor, which ended production the same month.

References 

Electra
Front-wheel-drive vehicles
Convertibles
Rear-wheel-drive vehicles
Full-size vehicles
Coupés
Sedans
1960s cars
1970s cars
1980s cars
1990s cars
Motor vehicles manufactured in the United States
Cars introduced in 1959
Flagship vehicles